The 2011 Basingstoke and Deane Council election took place on 5 May 2011 to elect members of Basingstoke and Deane Borough Council in Hampshire, England. One third of the council was up for election and the Conservative Party stayed in overall control of the council.

Election result
The election had 21 seats being contested, with the contest in Popley East being a by-election after Mary Brian resigned from the council. The Conservatives remained in control of the council with 34 seats, while Labour gained 2 seats to have 11 councillors. Meanwhile, the Liberal Democrats lost one seat, but remained the second largest group with 13 seats. Independents stayed on 2 seats, while the Basingstoke First Community Party lost its only seat on the council. Overall turnout in the election was 45%.

Labour narrowly gained the seat of Brighton Hill North from the Liberal Democrats and took South Ham from the Conservatives. However the Conservatives won Hatch Warren and Beggarwood, where the previous councillor, Phil Heath from the Basingstoke First Community Party, had stood down at the election. The winner in Hatch Warren and Beggarwood, Conservative Rebecca Bean, became the youngest councillor at the age of 24. There were also close results in Baughurst and Tadley North, and Winklebury, with the Conservatives holding both seats over the Liberal Democrat and Labour parties respectively. Meanwhile, independent Martin Biermann held his seat in Chineham with 1,335 votes, compared to 1,252 votes for Conservative John Downes.

After the election, the composition of the council was:
Conservative 34
Liberal Democrats 13
Labour 11
Independent 2

Ward results

References

2011
2011 English local elections
2010s in Hampshire